Rikhteh Kuh (also Romanized as Rīkhteh Kūh) is a village in Kashkan Rural District, Shahivand District, Dowreh County, Lorestan Province, Iran.

Population 
At the 2006 census, its population was 110, in 19 families.

References 

Towns and villages in Dowreh County